The European Law Institute (ELI) is an independent non-profit organisation established to initiate, conduct and facilitate research, make recommendations and provide practical guidance in the field of European legal development with a goal of enhancing the European legal integration.
The idea of an ELI was inspired by the activities of the American Law Institute (ALI), founded in 1923 and headquartered in Philadelphia, Pennsylvania. ELI has individual and institutional members, some of whom have voting rights. Members of ELI include law professors, attorneys, judges and other professionals in the legal industry.

Pascal Pichonnaz, Professor for Swiss contract law, Roman law, as well as European consumer law and comparative contract law at the Faculty of Law of the University of Fribourg, was elected as President of the ELI in February 2021 and took office in September 2021, succeeding Christiane Wendehorst, Professor of civil law at the University of Vienna, who served as ELI President for two consecutive terms, from 2017–2021. History and Founding of the Institute 
In Europe, the idea to found a European Law Institute had been discussed for more than a decade. Two main initiatives were launched: in October 2008, a group of scholars from leading European law schools and research institutes convened in Brussels to discuss the project. Follow-up meetings took place in Prague, Amsterdam, Stockholm and Frankfurt. In March 2010, the Association for a European Law Institute (ELIA) was founded, which served to initiate and coordinate a Europe-wide debate. By 2011, the ELIA had around 250 members, academics from more than 100 European law faculties as well as judges, many of them from Member States' supreme courts, and legal professionals.

An independent initiative towards the foundation of a European Law Institute was taken by the Robert Schuman Centre for Advanced Studies of the European University Institute (EUI) in Florence. Four colleagues from the EUI launched a conference in April 2010, inviting many leading figures from European institutions and networks to discuss the idea.

Due to a great deal of overlap between the ELIA and the EUI initiatives, they came to be seen as possibly competing, prompting an inquiry into whether the two initiatives can be brought together and whether common guidelines can be developed for the establishment of a European Law Institute. A meeting in that regard was held on the premises of the Hamburg Max Planck Institute on 22 and 23 June 2010. Following the Hamburg meeting, a joint project group was formed by the ELIA and EUI initiatives and further networks and stakeholder organisations. A first meeting of this joint project group and of observers from the European Commission was held in Vienna on 23 and 24 November 2010 on the premises of the Austrian Supreme Court.

The resulting Vienna Memorandum provided a roadmap for the establishment of the European Law Institute.

Following an agreement between 52 founding members made in Athens on 16 April 2011, the ELI was recognised as an International Non-Profit Association (AISBL/IVZW/IVoG) under Belgian law by Royal Decree of 1 June 2011 and presented to the public in Paris on the same day.

On 31 May 2011, former Advocate General at the Court of Justice of the European Union Sir Francis Jacobs was elected as the first President of the ELI.

 Structure 
The highest body of the Institute is the Membership which elects from among its Fellows the main governing body: the Council. The Council is made up of 56 elected individuals representing different legal traditions, professions and disciplines. In addition to the elected Council members, the ELI President, the two Vice-Presidents and the Treasurer become ex-officio members of the Council from the moment they take office. Further, up to 10 ex-officio members from selected institutions can be offered ex-officio seats on the Council. Many prominent figures in the European legal arena form this body, including Lord Chief Justice of England and Wales John Thomas, Baron Thomas of Cwmgiedd. The Council delegates many of its tasks and powers to its standing committees which deal with matters such as membership and fundraising. It elects from amongst its members an Executive Committee, the Association's administrative body. Furthermore, there is a Senate in place to provide advice, which appoints from among its members an Arbitral Tribunal, tasked with settling any disputes within the organisation. The Speaker of the ELI Senate is Reinhard Zimmermann. The ELI Secretariat, which is hosted by the University of Vienna, is tasked to support the competent bodies of the Institute. It is headed by Secretary General Vanessa Wilcox.

 Membership 
ELI currently has close to 1,700 Individual Members and 120 Institutional Members, representing all branches of law and legal professions. Membership is subject to approval by the ELI Council and must be supported by at least two existing ELI Fellows acting as referees or, exceptionally, on the invitation of the ELI Council.

The Institute has two categories of members:
 Fellows, who may either be Individual or Institutional; or
 Observers, who may either be Individual or InstitutionalIndividual Fellows must be natural persons and must actively engage, by their professional, vocational or scholarly activities, in European legal development. They must undertake to speak, vote and participate in activities carried out within the framework of the Association on the basis of their own personal and professional convictions without regard to the interests of particular stakeholders.Individual Observers must be reputable natural persons who take an active interest in European legal development.Institutional Fellows and Observers''' must be legal entities representing organisations, institutions or networks, which are actively involved in European legal development. An institution is free to opt to be a Fellow (with voting rights) or an Observer (without voting rights).

ELI's Work 
Among ELI’s core tasks are:

 to evaluate and stimulate the development of EU law, legal policy, and practice, and in particular make proposals for the further development of the acquis and for the enhancement of EU law implementation by the Member States;
 to identify and analyse legal developments in areas within the competence of Member States which are relevant at the EU level;
 to study EU approaches regarding international law and enhance the role EU law could play globally, for instance in drafting international instruments or model rules;
 to conduct and facilitate pan-European research, in particular to draft, evaluate or improve principles and rules which are common to the European legal systems; and
 to provide a forum, for discussion and cooperation, of jurists irrespective of their vocation or occupation, inter alia academics, judges, lawyers and other legal professionals, who take an active interest in European legal development and together represent a broad range of legal traditions.

To accomplish its tasks, ELI operates on its own initiative. It is also, however, available for consultation by institutions involved in the development of law on a European, international or national level.

ELI Hubs and SIGs (Special Interest Groups) 
ELI Hubs and SIGs serve as a two-way communication channel between the ELI and its members. They were established for members to facilitate discussion, share and monitor legal developments, and stimulate project proposals. Whereas Hubs are country specific groups, and thus allow ELI members to meet closer to home and communicate in their native language, SIGs are topic specific. ELI currently has 14 Hubs, and 11 SIGs.

Projects and Similar Initiatives 
Projects carried out under the auspices of the ELI must be at the service of the European citizen by improving the law or facilitating its application; aim at results that potentially have immediate practical impact; be effectuated through collaboration between jurists from academia and from legal practice; and take a genuinely pan-European perspective as well as consider the achievements of the various legal cultures. An overview on current and completed projects can be found on the ELI’s webpage.

ELI projects fall in four broad categories:

 Draft legislative proposals;
 Model laws, model rules, policies, statements of principles;
 Checklists, other practical guidance; and
 Position papers.
ELI also embarks on other shorter-term initiatives. 

The ELI’s output is available for free download from the publications section of its website.

Links 
 European Law Institute website
 EU Commission press release, 1 June 2011
 Stream of the ELI Opening on 17 November 2011 
 Towards a European Law Institute: A Joint Initiative
 L’Institut Européen du Droit The European Law Institute (ELI)

References

European Union law research institutes
2011 establishments in the European Union